The 1977 NBA All-Star Game was played on February 13, 1977, at MECCA Arena in Milwaukee, home of the Milwaukee Bucks. This was the 27th edition of the NBA All-Star Game, and the first to be played after the ABA-NBA merger. It was the first time the NBA All-Star Game was played on a Sunday afternoon after the previous 26 games had been played in the evening.

The Western Conference defeated the Eastern Conference, 125–124. Julius Erving, in his first NBA All-Star Game, was awarded the Most Valuable Player trophy by league commissioner Larry O'Brien, becoming only the second player to win the award despite losing.

All-Star Game

Coaches
The Eastern Conference team was coached by Gene Shue, head coach of the Philadelphia 76ers who had a 33–20 record on February 13. This was Shue's second time coaching in an all-star game. The Western Conference team was coached by future hall-of-famer Larry Brown, head coach of the Denver Nuggets who had a 34–19 record on February 13. This was Brown's first time coaching in an all-star game.

Players

The starting players were voted on by the fans, and seven reserves for each team were selected by their respective coaches. Twelve former ABA players, including Julius Erving of the Philadelphia 76ers, participated in the game. The Eastern Conference team played ten future hall-of-famers including Bob McAdoo, Julius Erving, George McGinnis, Rudy Tomjanovich (inducted as a coach), Pete Maravich, John Havlicek, Jo Jo White, Earl Monroe, George Gervin, and Elvin Hayes. The Western Conference Team played seven future hall-of-famers including Kareem Abdul-Jabbar, Rick Barry, Paul Westphal, David Thompson, Bob Lanier, Bobby Jones, and Dan Issel.

Despite being selected as a reserve, Los Angeles Laker player Kareem Abdul-Jabbar led the West team in scoring with 21 points. This was Abdul-Jabbar's eighth appearance in the all-star game. Another Western Conference player, Paul Westphal, was an honorable mention scoring 20 points in his first of five consecutive appearances in the all-star game. On the Eastern team, Julius Erving and Bob McAdoo of the Buffalo Braves dominated their team's scoring, each recording 30 points. This was McAdoo's fourth all-star appearance, and Erving's first of eleven consecutive all-star appearances.

Notable player selections that did not play due to injury were, on the Western side, future hall-of-famer Bill Walton of the Portland Trail Blazers, and, on the Eastern side, future hall-of-famer Dave Cowens of the Boston Celtics. Walton would be replaced by Don Buse of the Indiana Pacers, and Cowens would be replaced by Phil Chenier of the Washington Bullets. Walton would return that season to lead the Blazers, with the help of all-star teammate Maurice Lucas, to a 1977 NBA Finals victory over the 76ers, who were led by all-stars Julius Erving, George McGinnis, and Doug Collins.

Roster

Recap

Julius Erving set the tone early, helping the East to a 34–23 lead over the West going into the second quarter. At half-time the West had only shaved the lead by a point with the score sitting at 58–68 in favor of the East. However, in the third quarter the West scored 39 points and stymied the Easts offense limiting them to only 21 points. Going into the fourth quarter with the West favoring the East 97–89, Bob McAdoo of the East produced a flurry of offense scoring 14 points in the period. The boost brought the East back to within one point of the West with a chance to score in the closing seconds of the game. The East never got their final shot of as Paul Westphal stole the ball from West guard Pete Maravich who passed it downcourt to teammate Rick Barry who ran the clock out giving the West the one-point win.

Eastern Conference

Western Conference

Score by periods
 

Halftime— East, 68-58
Third Quarter— West, 97-89
Officials: Earl Strom and Lee Jones
Attendance: 10,938.

References

Sources

Events in Milwaukee
National Basketball Association All-Star Game
All-Star
NBA All-Star